Grégoire Lefebvre (born 13 May 1994) is a French professional footballer who plays as a midfielder for  club Versailles.

Career
Lefebvre is a youth exponent from AJ Auxerre. He made his Ligue 2 debut on 13 December 2013 against Niort in a 2–0 home win. He managed to play 12 league games in his first season.

In June 2022, Lefebvre moved to Versailles.

References

1994 births
Living people
Association football midfielders
French footballers
Ligue 2 players
Championnat National players
Championnat National 2 players
Championnat National 3 players
AJ Auxerre players
Red Star F.C. players
AS Nancy Lorraine players
FC Versailles 78 players